The 1878 East Somerset by-election was held on 20 March 1878.  The by-election was held due to the death of the incumbent Conservative MP, Richard Bright.  It was won by the unopposed Conservative candidate Sir Philip Miles.

References

1878 in England
1878 elections in the United Kingdom
By-elections to the Parliament of the United Kingdom in Somerset constituencies
19th century in Somerset
Unopposed by-elections to the Parliament of the United Kingdom in English constituencies